Levi Woodbury (December 22, 1789September 4, 1851) was an American attorney, jurist, and Democratic politician from New Hampshire. During a four-decade career in public office, Woodbury served as Associate Justice of the Supreme Court of the United States, a United States Senator, the ninth governor of New Hampshire, and cabinet member in the Andrew Jackson and Martin Van Buren administrations. He was promoted as a candidate for the Democratic nomination for President of the United States in 1848.

Born in Francestown, New Hampshire, he established a legal practice in Francestown in 1812. After serving in the New Hampshire Senate, he was appointed to the New Hampshire Supreme Court in 1817. He served as Governor of New Hampshire from 1823 to 1824 and represented New Hampshire in the Senate from 1825 to 1831, becoming affiliated with the Democratic Party of Andrew Jackson. He served as the United States Secretary of the Navy under President Jackson and as the United States Secretary of the Treasury under Jackson and President Martin Van Buren.

He served another term representing New Hampshire in the Senate from 1841 to 1845, when he accepted President James K. Polk's appointment to the Supreme Court. Woodbury was the first Justice to have attended law school. He received significant support for the presidential nomination at the 1848 Democratic National Convention, particularly among New England delegates, but the nomination went to Lewis Cass of Michigan. Woodbury served on the court until his death in 1851. Woodbury died of an inflammatory tumor in the stomach.

Life and early career
Woodbury was born in Francestown, New Hampshire, the son of Mary and Peter Woodbury. He began his education at Atkinson Academy. He graduated from Dartmouth College, Phi Beta Kappa, in 1809, briefly attended Tapping Reeve Law School in Litchfield, Connecticut, and read law to be admitted to the New Hampshire Bar in 1812. He became the first Supreme Court justice to attend law school. He was in private practice in Francestown from 1812 to 1816. He also joined the Freemasons.

His education contributed to his early start in law, which led to his later political positions. During his time in Francestown, he wrote the Hillsborough Resolves to defend the Madison administration for their decisions in the War of 1812, which marked the beginning of his political involvement. Following the publication of his defense, he gained the recognition he needed to receive an appointment as clerk of the New Hampshire State Senate from 1816 to 1817. In quick succession, he was appointed to the Superior Court of Judicature from 1817 to 1823, and in 1823, he was elected as the Governor of New Hampshire. During the time of his gubernatorial election, there was factionalism within the party. The caucus chose Samuel Dinsmoor as the candidate for governor, but an "irregular" public convention elected Woodbury as the other candidate. Woodbury defeated Dinsmoor by a wide margin, but his one year as governor was a failure. He tried to reconcile the Federalists and Democratic-Republicans but did not make a lot of progress. Throughout Woodbury's political career, he was characterized as being independent and moderate, which some scholars interpret as indecisiveness and hesitancy.

After his term as governor, he served as Speaker of the New Hampshire House of Representatives in 1825.

Federal government service

Senate and Cabinet service

Woodbury served as a United States Senator from New Hampshire from 1825 until 1831, during which time he served as the Chairman of the Senate Commerce Committee (1827–31). Elected to serve in the New Hampshire State Senate in 1831, Woodbury did not take office due to his appointment as United States Secretary of the Navy under President Andrew Jackson, from 1831 to 1834. At the beginning of this term, he was instrumental in the appointment of fellow New Hampshireman Edmund Roberts as special agent and envoy to the Far East. Woodbury served as Secretary of the Treasury under Jackson and Martin Van Buren from 1834 to 1841, and served again as Senator from New Hampshire from 1841 to 1845. He was a justice of the U.S. Supreme Court, 1845 to 1851.

As a U.S. Senator, Woodbury was a dependable Jackson Democrat, successfully working to end the Second Bank of the United States; like Jackson he favored an "independent" treasury system and "hard money" over paper money. In retrospect, the financial Panic of 1837 and the collapse of speculative land prices were legacies of Woodbury's tenure. After the Panic, Woodbury realised that the U.S. Treasury needed a more secure administration of its own funds than commercial banks supplied, and he backed the act for an "Independent Treasury System" passed by Congress in 1840. It was largely repealed under the new administration the following year, but the foundation was laid for an independent U.S. Treasury, finally established in 1846, under President James K. Polk. Woodbury also served as chairman of the U.S. Senate Committee on Finance during a Special Session of the 29th Congress.  His ten-day chairmanship is the shortest on record.

Supreme Court tenure

In the 1844 presidential election, Woodbury and the Jackson Democrats supported the Democrats' nomination of Polk. In that year, Woodbury also delivered a Phi Beta Kappa Address at his alma mater, Dartmouth College, titled "Progress." The address discussed Thomas Cole's series of five landscape paintings, The Course of Empire. Woodbury believed that, unlike Cole's depiction of a cycle of rise and decline, in the United States there would only be a rise.

On September 20, 1845, Polk gave Woodbury a recess appointment as an associate justice of the United States Supreme Court, to a seat vacated by Joseph Story. He was sworn into office three days later. Formally nominated to the seat on December 23, 1845, Woodbury was confirmed by the United States Senate on January 3, 1846.

News of Woodbury's appointment was well received by the public and he was praised as a protector of constitutional rights. During his tenure, he wrote major opinions for the Court regarding the Contract Clause, slavery, the political question doctrine, and the Commerce Clause.

He was promoted as a candidate for president at the 1848 Democratic National Convention, his support was largely centered in New England. He remained on the Court until his death at age 61 in 1851, in Portsmouth, New Hampshire.

Personal writings
Woodbury's writings shed light on his rulings as a justice, which reflect his strict constructionist views. He was one of the few justices on the court at the time to write outside of his rulings, along with McLean and Taney. Woodbury was concerned with individual rights before those rights were the focus of the court, and also thought slavery was wrong. He wrote of the judicial powers:

Woodbury ruled based on the powers that exist in the Constitution. He believed that slavery was written into the Constitution but could be scaled down by Congress. In his rulings as a justice, he abided by the Fugitive Slave Clause in Article IV, Section 2.

Jones v. Van Zandt
Although Woodbury had already died when the Court decided Dred Scott v. Sandford (1857), he set a precedent when he wrote for the majority in Jones v. Van Zandt (1847). Van Zandt was an abolitionist in Ohio who harbored fugitive slaves. He was sued for $500 for violating the Fugitive Slave Act of 1793. The primary issue was whether the Fugitive Slave Act was constitutional. Woodbury ruled in favor of the rights of slaveholders, arguing that the compromises in the Constitution, such as the Fugitive Slave Clause, bound the states to enforce the act. As a strict constructionist, he defended the rights of slaveholders as protected in the Constitution, regardless of his personal stance on slavery. Woodbury viewed slavery as a political question that should be settled by each state. He stated, "[T]his Court has no alternative, while they exist, but to stand by the Constitution and laws with fidelity to their duties and their oaths ... to go where that Constitution and the laws lead, and not to break both." This decision helped reinforce the idea that slavery was written into the Constitution and that slaveholders' rights were protected. It furthered the precedent established in Prigg v. Pennsylvania that the Fugitive Slave Act was constitutional and paved the way for the Dred Scott decision.

Contract Clause cases
Aside from his contribution to the precedent for slavery cases, Woodbury shaped the Court's interpretation of the Contract Clause by reinforcing the obligation of contracts. His tenure on the Court came during a confused and sectionally divided era in Supreme Court history. In Planters' Bank v. Sharp (1848), Mississippi passed a statute forbidding a state bank from transferring notes to other banks because of the instability of the banking system after the Bank War. The issue the Court had to decide was "whether an act of the legislature of Mississippi ... impaired the obligation of any contract which the state or others had previously entered into with Planters' Bank." Woodbury ruled in favor of the bank and found that the Mississippi statute violated the contract clause in Article 1, Section 10 of the Constitution. He explained which contracts were violated under the statute: "First, in the obligation of the contract in the charter with the state; and secondly, in the obligation of the contract made by the signers of the note declared on with the bank." The contracts were valid because a bank had the power to make them when they related to the bank's business purposes and monetary dealings, along with a right to sell anything that it owned. Justices Taney and Peter V. Daniel dissented, favoring more state control. Woodbury's leadership in dealing with the Commerce Clause helped reinforce the Contract Clause, whereas Taney would have taken the court in a direction that placed state power over contracts.

Commerce Clause cases
Woodbury also formed the basis for the interpretation of the Commerce Clause in the License Cases, in which he developed a case-by-case method for determining the extent of state regulatory power. His reasoning was the basis for the Cooley Doctrine, a later development by his successor, Justice Benjamin R. Curtis. In the License Cases, the Court dealt with state liquor-censoring statutes. Lacking a clear precedent for how much power the states had under the Constitution to regulate commerce, the justices were not unified enough to write a majority opinion. Woodbury's opinion focused on the context on a case-by-case basis instead of deciding based on an abstract principle of commerce power. He stated, "[The] subject of buying and selling within a state is one as exclusively belonging to the power of the state over its internal trade as that to regulate foreign commerce is with the general government under the broadest construction of that power." He distinguished between a prohibition on selling liquor on a certain day and a prohibition on imports, which would reach into the federal government's jurisdiction of commerce. Woodbury studied the particulars of the case instead of examining only the source of power in the Commerce Clause. The Court later followed Woodbury's reasoning in Cooley v. Board of Wardens, where it held that the Court would decide on a case-by-case basis, depending on whether the subject of regulation was local in nature or required national legislation. Woodbury's opinion helped bring about this shift.

Woodbury's contributions to the interpretation of the Commerce Clause extended to a defense of states' rights in Waring v. Clarke. He dissented from the majority's attempts to expand federal admiralty jurisdiction. A ship accident occurred near New Orleans on the Mississippi river, and the Court had to decide whether the federal government or the Louisiana government had jurisdiction over it. Woodbury disagreed with the assertion that the federal government had jurisdiction over every river that was controlled by the ocean's tide, because citizens who had gotten into accidents on the water would have to travel greater distances if the federal government was involved rather than settling the dispute near where it happened. He urged that the government resist interfering with state power that is written into the Constitution, and went so far as to say that the extension of federal power could be troublesome when applied to issues such as slavery. Woodbury warned that overextending federal powers would lead to "a struggle for jurisdiction between courts of the states and courts of the United States, always delicate, and frequently endangering the harmony of our political system." He advocated states' rights, indicating how he would rule in future slavery cases as a strict constructionist.

Legacy

Woodbury is one of the few individuals to serve in all three branches of U.S. government and one of three people to have served in all three branches and also as a U.S. governor (the others being Salmon P. Chase and James F. Byrnes). Named in his honor are Woodbury County, Iowa; Woodbury, Minnesota; Woodbury, Tennessee; Woodbury Avenue in Portsmouth, New Hampshire; Woodbury School in Salem, New Hampshire; and several ships called the USS Woodbury. He is featured on a New Hampshire historical marker (number 43) along New Hampshire Route 136 in Francestown. His daughter Mary married Montgomery Blair, Abraham Lincoln's Postmaster General. His son Charles L. Woodbury was a lawyer who served as United States Attorney for the District of Massachusetts and served on the New Hampshire House of Representatives and the Massachusetts General Court.

Works
 Political, Judicial, and Literary Writings (edited by N. Capen, Boston, 1852)

See also
 Harrison Gray Dyar
 Levi Woodbury Homestead
 List of justices of the Supreme Court of the United States

Notes

References

Sources
 
 
 Dictionary of American Biography.
 Capowski, Vincent. The Making of a Jacksonian Democrat: Levi Woodbury, 1789-1851 Ph.D. dissertation, Fordham University, 1966
 Woodbury, Levi. Writings of Levi Woodbury. 3 vols. Boston: Little, Brown and Co., 1852.
 Bader, M.D., and Roy M. Mersky. "Justice Levi Woodbury: A Representational Study." Journal of Supreme Court History 23 (1998): 129–142. Accessed November 9, 2015. doi: 10.1111/j.1540-5818.1998.tb00140.x
 Friedman, Leon, Ed. The Justices of the United States Supreme Court 1789-1969: Their Lives and Major Opinions. Vol. 2, 843–854. New York: Chelsea House Publishers, 1969. Print.
 Woodbury, Levi. Writings of Levi Woodbury, LL.: D. Political, Judicial, and Literary. Vol. 2. Edited by Nahum Capen. Boston: Little, Brown and Company, 1852. Accessed November 9, 2015.

External links

 

|-

|-

|-

|-

|-

|-

|-

|-

1789 births
1851 deaths
19th-century American politicians
19th-century American judges
People from Francestown, New Hampshire
American people of English descent
American Presbyterians
United States Secretaries of the Navy
United States Secretaries of the Treasury
Jackson administration cabinet members
Van Buren administration cabinet members
New Hampshire Democratic-Republicans
New Hampshire Jacksonians
Jacksonian United States senators from New Hampshire
Democratic Party United States senators from New Hampshire
Justices of the Supreme Court of the United States
United States federal judges appointed by James K. Polk
United States federal judges admitted to the practice of law by reading law
Recess appointments
Governors of New Hampshire
Democratic-Republican Party state governors of the United States
Speakers of the New Hampshire House of Representatives
Democratic Party members of the New Hampshire House of Representatives
Justices of the New Hampshire Supreme Court
American Freemasons
Politicians from Portsmouth, New Hampshire
New Hampshire lawyers
Dartmouth College alumni
Burials in New Hampshire
Litchfield Law School alumni